Epex (stylized as EPEX; shortened from Eight Apex) is an eight-member South Korean boy band formed by C9 in 2021, consisting of Wish, Keum, Mu, A-Min, Baekseung, Ayden, Yewang and Jeff. The group debuted on June 8, 2021, with their first EP titled Bipolar Pt.1: Prelude of Anxiety.

History

Pre-debut activities
Keum is a former contestant of Mnet's Produce X 101. As a 2-year old trainee representing C9 Entertainment, he was eliminated in the final episode and was ranked 17th place.

2021: Debut with Bipolar series
C9 Entertainment opened several SNS accounts on March 1, 2021, stating that they would become the artist accounts for the new idol group prior their debut.

On April 1, 2021, the group's official name was announced to be EPEX, which stands for "Eight Apex". The meaning of the group is said to be when the gathering of eight youths reaches eight different apexes.

On May 7, 2021, a teaser titled "Prelude of Anxiety" was released on the group's SNS accounts. Their debut EP, Bipolar Pt.1: Prelude of Anxiety and its lead single "Lock Down", was released on June 8.

On September 24, 2021, a teaser titled "Prelude of Love" was released on the group's SNS accounts.  Their second EP, Bipolar Pt.2: Prelude of Love and its lead single "Do 4 Me" was released on October 26.

2022–present: continue with Prelude series, first concert tour
On March 15, 2022, a teaser titled "21st Century Boys" was released on the group's SNS accounts.  Their third EP, Prelude of Anxiety Chapter 1. '21st Century Boys and its lead single "Anthem of Teen Spirit" was released on April 11.

On October 26, they released their fourth EP Prelude of Love Chapter 1. 'Puppy Love' , a sequel of their 2021 EP Bipolar Pt.2: Prelude of Love, alongside the lead single "Hymn To Love". To commemorate of the EP release, they held an online showcase in the same day. The group also announced their first international concert tour, Eight Apex', starting from Seoul on November 19 & 20, following Osaka, Tokyo, Taipei, Kuala Lumpur and more cities would be announced later.

Members
Adapted from their Naver profile and website profile.
 Wish (위시) – leader, vocalist, dancer
 Keum / Keum Donghyun (금동현) – rapper, dancer
 MU (뮤) – vocalist
 A-Min (아민) – vocalist, dancer
 Baekseung (백승) – rapper
 Ayden (에이든) – rapper
 Yewang (예왕) – vocalist
 Jeff (제프) – rapper

Discography

Extended plays

Singles

Filmography

Television shows

Concerts and tours

Headlining
 Eight Apex (2022–present)

Awards and nominations

Notes

References

External links
  

2021 establishments in South Korea
Musical groups from Seoul
K-pop music groups
Musical groups established in 2021
South Korean dance music groups
South Korean boy bands